This is a list of the world's busiest seaports by cargo tonnage, the total mass, or in some cases volume, of actual cargo transported through the port. The rankings are based on AAPA world port ranking data.

The cargo rankings based on tonnage should be interpreted with caution since these measures are not directly comparable and cannot be converted to a single, standardized unit. In the Measure column, MT = Metric Tons, HT = Harbor Tons, FT = Freight Tons, and RT = Revenue Tons.

2018–2019

2012–2017

Rankings 2004–2011

2005

2004

2003

2002

References and notes

AAPA World Port Rankings 2003
AAPA World Port Rankings 2002

Economy-related lists of superlatives
Busiest ports by cargo tonnage